The 2018 Dutch Athletics Championships was the national championship in outdoor track and field for the Netherlands. It was held on 21 to 24 June at the Sportpark Maarschalkerweerd in Utrecht. It served as the selection meeting for the Netherlands at the 2018 European Athletics Championships. 

The pole vault was held at Vredenburg in the city centre on June 21, while the 10,000 metres championship was contested separately at the Leiden Golden Spike meeting on 9 June.

Results

Men

Women

References

Results
 Uitslagen op Atletiek.nu
 Uitslagen 10.000 m op Atletiek.nu

External links 
 Official website of the Royal Dutch Athletics Federation 

2018
Dutch Athletics Championships
Dutch Championships
Athletics Championships
Sports competitions in Utrecht (city)